Morchellium is a genus of colonial sea squirts, tunicates in the family Polyclinidae.

Species
The World Register of Marine Species lists the following species:

Morchellium albidum Kott, 1992
Morchellium appendiculatum (Michaelsen, 1923)
Morchellium argus (Milne-Edwards, 1841)
Morchellium giardi Herdman, 1886
Morchellium leviventer (Monniot & Gaill, 1978)
Morchellium pannosum Kott, 1992

References

Enterogona
Tunicate genera